De Akkers is the most southwestern subway station of the Rotterdam Metro and is located in the Dutch city of Spijkenisse. The station, with one island platform, opened on 25 April 1985 as a terminus of the North-South Line (also formerly called Erasmus line), nowadays line D. Since the extension of the East-West Line (Caland line) opened on 4 November 2002, the station also serves as terminus of that line. The station is named for the adjacent neighbourhood and is located on top of its shopping mall.

Whale tail sculpture
In 2002, two whale sculptures, designed by architect  and named Walvisstaarten (Dutch for Whale's tails) were installed at the end of the sidings beyond the station. The sculptures were made of reinforced polyester.

Train accident

Just after midnight on 2 November 2020, an empty metro train, operated by RET, on the Rotterdam Metro crashed through the buffer stop at the end of the sidings beyond the station. The sidings are built on a viaduct projecting out over the canal. Only the driver was on board when the accident happened and he freed himself without injury. He was taken to hospital as a precautionary measure. Maarten Struijs, the sculptor who created the artwork, said he was surprised that the sculpture had held together.

Following the accident, Struijs was interviewed about the sculptures, and reported that he was surprised the statue was able to hold the weight of the train, and stated that "it does look rather poetic." He said the statue was never meant to be an extra safety measure for the trains.

Since the crash, these sculptures have been referred to in some media with the name Saved by a Whale's Tail.

See also
O'Hare station train crash: A Chicago Transit Authority train operator fell asleep at the throttle and overshot the buffers at the Chicago O'Hare International Airport station
Moorgate tube crash: A London Underground train overshot the buffers at Moorgate tube station

References

External links
Joey Bremer. Photographs on Twitter

Rotterdam Metro stations
Nissewaard
Railway stations opened in 1985
1985 establishments in the Netherlands
Railway stations in the Netherlands opened in the 20th century